OHSAS 18001, Occupational Health and Safety Assessment Series, was an international standard for occupational health and safety management systems that was subsequently adopted as a British Standard. Compliance with it enabled organizations to demonstrate that they had a system in place for occupational health and safety. BSI cancelled OHSAS 18001 to adopt ISO 45001. ISO 45001 was published in March 2018 by the International Organization for Standardization. Organizations that are certified to OHSAS 18001 were able to migrate to ISO 45001 by March 2021 to retain a recognized certification.

Origins
Organizations worldwide recognize the need to control and improve health and safety performance and do so with occupational health and safety management systems (OHSMS). However, before 1999 there was an increase of national standards and proprietary certification schemes to choose from. This caused confusion and fragmentation in the market and undermined the credibility of individual schemes.

Development

Recognising this deficit, an international collaboration called the Occupational Health and Safety Assessment Series (OHSAS) Project Group was formed to create a single unified approach. The Group comprised representatives from national standards bodies, academic bodies, accreditation bodies, certification bodies and occupational safety and health institutions, with the UK’s national standards body, BSI Group, providing the secretariat. Drawing on the best of existing standards and schemes, the OHSAS Project Group published the OHSAS 18000 Series in 1999. The Series consisted of two specifications: 18001 provided requirements for an OHS management system and 18002 gave implementation guidelines.

Adoption as British Standard
BSI Group decided to adopt OHSAS 18001 (OHSMS) and OHSAS 18002 (guidance specification) as British standards.

OHSAS 18001 was updated in July 2007 in particular to better reflect ILO-OSH guidelines and additionally, the "health" component of "health and safety" was given greater emphasis.

Since the publication of the International Standard for Occupational Health and Safety Management Systems ISO 45001, BSI canceled its OHSAS 18001 standards and adopted the ISO standard.

Disambiguation
The OHSAS 18000 standards were written and published wholly outside of the International Organization for Standardization (ISO) framework. To avoid confusion, ISO 18000 does exist – but it is a radio-frequency identification standard.

See also 
 ISO 37001-Anti-bribery management systems

References

External links 
 

Environmental standards
Safety codes
Occupational safety and health